Luis Merlo de la Fuente Ruiz de Beteta was a Spanish colonial official who briefly served as the Royal Governor of Chile, in 1610–11.

Biography
He was born in Valdepeñas, Spain to Luis Merlo de la Fuente and Maria Ruiz de Betena. He went to America, specifically Panama, in 1588 in the capacity of an oidor or judge, later travelling to Lima, Peru. From there the viceroy at the time, García Hurtado de Mendoza, 5th Marquis of Cañete, sent him to Santiago, Chile to judge the governor, Alonso de Sotomayor, for possible misconduct.

Later, he travelled as an emissary to various colonial cities. When Philip III wanted to reinstate the Real Audiencia in Chile, he was selected as one of the oidores which compose that type of body. The members of the Audiencia arrived in Santiago by April 24, 1609, and were installed by September 9 of the same year.

Upon the illness of the governor, Alonso García de Ramón, Merlo de la Fuente was eventually designated the successor, and he took command on September 2, 1610. This duty lasted only until January 15, 1611, however. During this period Merlo de la Fuente faced a rising by the Mapuche Indians, who tried to take advantage of the death of the previous governor.

In 1612, he returned to Lima, and in 1620 he retired from the Crown's service.

People from the Province of Ciudad Real
Royal Governors of Chile
Spanish generals
17th-century Spanish people
17th-century Chilean people
Year of death unknown
Year of birth unknown
University of Salamanca alumni